Sergio De Luca (born 5 September 1955) is a Sammarinese weightlifter. He competed in the men's lightweight event at the 1980 Summer Olympics.

References

1955 births
Living people
Sammarinese male weightlifters
Olympic weightlifters of San Marino
Weightlifters at the 1980 Summer Olympics
Place of birth missing (living people)